Sergei Borisovich Kabanov (born 15 March 1986) is a former Russian footballer.

Personal life
He is the younger brother of Maksim Kabanov.

Honours
Russian Premier League runner-up: 2006, 2007
Russian Cup finalist: 2006

External links
 Player page on the official FC Tom Tomsk website

1986 births
Footballers from Moscow
Living people
Russian footballers
Association football defenders
FC Spartak Moscow players
FC Dynamo Stavropol players
FC Spartak Vladikavkaz players
FC Tom Tomsk players
FC Shinnik Yaroslavl players
FC Volgar Astrakhan players
FC Torpedo Moscow players
FC Metallurg Lipetsk players
Russian Premier League players
FC Sever Murmansk players